Amit Varshizky (born in 1977, Haifa, Israel) is an Israeli scientist specializing in intellectual and cultural history of Nazi Germany, racial science and racial philosophy in early 20th-century Germany, and political theology and secularization theory with focus on modern German philosophy.

Varshizky is the author of several books on Race and Secularism, including The Metaphysics of Race: Science and Faith in the Nazi Worldview (forthcoming: The Open University of Israel press and Yad Vashem International Institute for Holocaust Research; the Goldberg prize winner for 2019), Secularism and Sacralism: Studies in the History of Religion, edited by Shalom Ratzabi, Eitan Ginsburg and Amit Varshizky (forthcoming, Sapir Academic Publishers).

Education
Born in Haifa, Israel Varshizky received his bachelor's degree in Mass Media and Communication from the Faculty of Social Sciences in Academic College of Emek Yezreel and his MA in History from the Tel Aviv University. In 2017 he was awarded a PhD in Studium History from  The Zvi Yavetz Graduate School of Historical Studies in Tel Aviv University.

Career
In 2016 Amit Varshizky was a lecturer in the History Department at Oranim academic college of Education as well as was teaching at the Department of Cultural Studies at Sapir Academic College and in the Department of Communications at the Academic College of Emek Izrael.

From 2017 to 2018 Varshizky was a Research Fellow at the Minerva Institute for German History of the Tel-Aviv University.

From 2018 to 2019 he was a Research Fellow at the Vidal Sassoon International Center for the Study of Antisemitism (SICSA) in The Hebrew University of Jerusalem.

Since November 2019 Varshizky worked on the postdoc and served as a guest researcher at the Jena Center 20th Century History.

Selected works
 Essays
 (2022) What Nazism Can Teach Us About the World's Forthcoming Revolutions. Haaretz.
 (2022) To Understand Putin, You First Need to Get Inside Aleksandr Dugin's Head. Haaretz. (The article received positive references.)
 (2022) ורשיצקי. גזע כמיתוס של מוצא: על גלגוליו של מושג במחשבת הנאורות.
 (2021) Non-Mechanistic Explanatory Styles in the German Racial Science: A Comparison of Hans F. K. Günther and Ludwig Ferdinand Clauß. Medicine and the Holocaust: New Studies on Victims, Perpetrators and Legacies for the 21st Century. 
 (2021) NON-MECHANISTIC EXPLANATORY STYLES IN INTERWAR GERMAN RACIAL THEORY. In book: Medicine and the Holocaust: New Studies on Victims, Perpetrators and Legacies for the 21st Century (pp. 21–43) Publisher: Berghahn Books.
 (2020) Startup Nation's Moral Values Are in Decline, and It's Not Just About the Occupation. Haaretz.
 (2020) מדוע מדעי הרוח הכרחיים דווקא בימינו? על הקשר בין ירידת החינוך ההומניסטי, שחיתות שלטונית וכיבוש. Haaretz.
 (2019) The Metaphysics of Race: Revisiting Nazism and Religion. Central European History.
 (2019) In the Shade of Wilhelm Wundt: Völkerpsychologie and its influence on National Socialist Racial Theory. Yalkut Moreshet-Holocaust Documentation and Research, 99.
 (2019) ורשיצקי. צילו של וילהלם וונדט: פסיכולוגיית העמים והשפעתה על תורת הגזע הנציונל־סוציאליסטית. ילקוט מורשת.
 (2017) In Search of the 'Whole Man': Soul-Man-World in the National Socialist Weltanschauung. Dapim: Studies on the Holocaust.
 (2017) ורשיצקי. בעקבות "האדם השלם": נפש-אדם-עולם בהשקפת העולם הנציונל-סוציאליסטית. דפים לחקר השואה.
 (2017) Between science and metaphysics: Fritz Lenz and racial anthropology in interwar Germany. Intellectual History Review.
 (2012) Alfred Rosenberg: The Nazi Weltanschauung as modern Gnosis. Politics, religion and ideology.
 Book reviews
 (2022) Review of Angelika Bammer, Born After: Reckoning with the German Past. PSYCHOANALYSIS AND HISTORY.
 (2018) Review: Transfinite Life. Oskar Goldberg and the Vitalist Imagination by Bruce Rosenstock. German Studies Review, 41:3 (October 2018), 642-644.

 Books
 (2021) המטפיזיקה של הגזע: מדע ואמונה בהשקפת העולם הנאצית. The Open University of Israel Press and Yad Vashem.
 Encyclopedias
 Racism, lexica entries, the Holocaust Resource Center – Yad Vashem (the Encyclopedia of the Holocaust edited by Dr. Shmuel Spector on Dr. Robert Rozett).

Awards
 The Goldberg prize (2019) for The Metaphysics of Race: Science and Faith in the Nazi Worldview (forthcoming: The Open University of Israel press and Yad Vashem International Institute for Holocaust Research.

Reviews 
 (2022) ההיסטוריון עמית ורשיצקי: "אני מנסה להבין את הנאציזם מבפנים". Haaretz.
 (2020) Samuel Koehne, Trinity Grammar School. Article Note: Amit Varshizky, ‘The Metaphysics of Race: Revisiting Nazism and Religion'. Contemporary Church History Quarterly. Volume 26, Number 3 (September 2020).

References

Historians of the Holocaust in Germany
Tel Aviv University alumni
Living people
People from Haifa
1977 births